Susan Elizabeth Holmes-McKagan  (born May 5, 1972) is an American model, television personality, and fashion designer. She is also known as the public face and founder of her business venture Susan Holmes Swimwear. According to an interview by Elsa Klensch on CNN, Holmes earned the title "The Body" from iconic fashion photographer Steven Meisel. She is married to Guns N' Roses musician Duff McKagan.

Early life
Holmes was born in Bowling Green, Ohio and is the daughter of Dr. John Holmes and Judith A. Holmes.  Her father is thrice a Fulbright Scholar, and part of the International Advertising Association, World Conference of Education and the United Nations. Holmes’ parents divorced in 1979, and Holmes moved out west with her older brother, sister and mother to San Diego, where Judith taught as an English teacher and San Diego County Office of Education Reading Specialist, helping children with learning disabilities to read.

Holmes graduated from the University of San Diego High School, was a cheerleader and on the honor roll.  She was voted by her class, in the "senior standouts" as the person most desired as "deserted island companion". Holmes was discovered at the age of 16, while dining in a restaurant in Manhattan and sitting at a table next to Jodie Foster. Fashion photographer Marco Glaviano approached Susan and asked if she was a model. After meeting various top agents, Holmes was accepted by two  modeling agencies, Ford and Elite. It was at the age of 17, that Holmes was on her first cover of a magazine (San Diego magazine) and also appearing in ads on billboards.

Career
Holmes' designer accomplishments stem from a career as an international model. Holmes worked for Dior, Dolce & Gabbana, Valentino, Chanel, Versace, John Galliano, Christian Lacroix, Herve Leger, Badgley Mischka, Nicole Miller, Marc Jacobs, and Prada. Holmes also has appeared in ad campaigns for Yves Saint Laurent, Fendi, Escada, Guess, Revlon, Karl Lagerfeld, Louis Vuitton, and Victoria's Secret. Holmes was in television commercials for Peugeot (which actually won an award and was filmed by Madonna videographer Jean-Baptiste Mondino). She then followed with two more commercials, for Triumph and H&M lingerie. Susan then starred as "the runaway bride" alongside fellow models Tyra Banks, Kate Moss, and Helena Christensen in the British film Inferno! She has appeared on the covers of Vogue, Elle, Marie Claire, Playboy and Australian Maxim.

Designer/television work
Susan Holmes Swimwear is a swimwear line that Holmes commenced in 1997. Susan's designs have been worn by celebrities such as Kate Hudson, Venus Williams, Heidi Klum, Stella McCartney, Elle Macpherson and Daryl Hannah. She was featured in Sports Illustrated Swimsuit edition and her bikini made entirely of guitar picks donned the calendar and DVD cover. Holmes gives back over 15% after net proceeds to charities. Holmes received an award from supermodel Niki Taylor, in New York City as "The Swimwear Designer of the Year" at the National Children Leukemia Foundation's –The Michael Awards in 2008.

Holmes was a creative director, celebrity guest judge and mentor/designer to the aspiring models on America's Next Top Model (Cycle 11 - You’re Beautiful, Now Change) alongside Tyra Banks. Her clothing designs have appeared on TvLand's "She's Got The Look", and she appeared on E! Channel's Married to Rock which debuted on November 7, 2010. Holmes was a regular correspondent on Fox News with Shepard Smith, reporting about American Idol. Holmes was given the key to the city of both Detroit, Michigan and Toledo, Ohio from Mayors Kwame Kilpatrick and Jack Ford, respectively, in recognition of her business accomplishments.

References

External links
 susanholmes.net
 

1972 births
Female models from Ohio
Living people
American fashion designers
American television personalities
American women television personalities
People from Bowling Green, Ohio
Participants in American reality television series
American women fashion designers
21st-century American women